Cabell County is located in the U.S. state of West Virginia. As of the 2020 census, the population was 94,350, making it West Virginia's fourth most-populous county. Its county seat is Huntington. The county was organized in 1809 and named for William H. Cabell, the Governor of Virginia from 1805 to 1808.
Cabell County is part of the Huntington-Ashland, WV-KY-OH Metropolitan Statistical Area.

Geography

In 1863, West Virginia's counties were divided into civil townships, with the intention of encouraging local government.  This proved impractical in the heavily rural state, and in 1872 the townships were converted into magisterial districts.  Cabell County was divided into five districts: Barboursville, Grant, Guyandotte, McComas, and Union.  Two additional districts, Gideon and Kyle, were established between 1920 and 1930.  Between 1980 and 1990, the county was redivided into five districts: District 1, District 2, District 3, District 4, and District 5.  The names and boundaries of the historic districts were preserved in the form of tax and assessment districts.

Major highways
 Interstate 64
 U.S. Route 52
 U.S. Route 60
 West Virginia Route 2
 West Virginia Route 10
 West Virginia Route 152
 West Virginia Route 527

Adjacent counties
 Gallia County, Ohio
Mason County (northeast)
Putnam County (east)
Lincoln County (southeast)
Wayne County (southwest)
Lawrence County, Ohio (northwest)

Demographics

2000 census
As of the census of 2000, there were 96,784 people, 41,180 households, and 25,490 families living in the county. There were 45,615 housing units at an average density of 162 per square mile (63/km2). The racial makeup of the county was 93.37% White, 4.29% Black or African American, 0.18% Native American, 0.77% Asian, 0.04% Pacific Islander, 0.20% from other races, and 1.14% from two or more races.  0.68% of the population were Hispanic or Latino of any race.

There were 41,180 households, out of which 25.20% had children under the age of 18 living with them, 47.10% were married couples living together, 11.60% had a female householder with no husband present, and 38.10% were non-families. 31.30% of all households were made up of individuals, and 12.50% had someone living alone who was 65 years of age or older.  The average household size was 2.27 and the average family size was 2.85.

In the county, the population was spread out, with 20.00% under the age of 18, 13.50% from 18 to 24, 26.80% from 25 to 44, 23.60% from 45 to 64, and 16.00% who were 65 years of age or older.  The median age was 38 years. For every 100 females there were 91.40 males.  For every 100 females age 18 and over, there were 88.50 males.

The median income for a household in the county was $28,479, and the median income for a family was $37,691. Males had a median income of $31,780 versus $22,243 for females. The per capita income for the county was $17,638.  About 13.70% of families and 19.20% of the population were below the poverty line, including 24.60% of those under age 18 and 10.80% of those age 65 or over.

2010 census
As of the 2010 United States Census, there were 96,319 people, 41,223 households, and 24,308 families living in the county. The racial makeup of the county was 91.6% white, 5.0% black or African American, 1.0% Asian, 0.2% American Indian, 0.3% from other races, and 2.0% from two or more races. Those of Hispanic or Latino origin made up 1.1% of the population. In terms of ancestry, 17.2% were Irish, 16.5% were English, 15.9% were German, and 10.7% were American.

Of the 41,223 households, 26.1% had children under the age of 18 living with them, 42.3% were married couples living together, 12.3% had a female householder with no husband present, 41.0% were non-families, and 33.5% of all households were made up of individuals. The average household size was 2.24 and the average family size was 2.85. The median age was 38.7 years.

The median income for a household in the county was $34,492 and the median income for a family was $48,323. Males had a median income of $39,523 versus $28,952 for females. The per capita income for the county was $21,907. About 15.3% of families and 20.6% of the population were below the poverty line, including 29.0% of those under age 18 and 10.7% of those age 65 or over.

Communities

City
Huntington (county seat; partly in Wayne County)

Town
Milton

Village
Barboursville

Magisterial districts
 District 1
 District 2
 District 3
 District 4
 District 5

Census-designated places
 Culloden
 Lesage 
 Pea Ridge 
 Salt Rock

Unincorporated communities

 Brownstown
 Clover
 Fudges Creek
 Hodges
 Indian Meadows
 Inez
 Johnson
 Melissa
 Ona
 Prairietown
 Reid
 Roach
 Sarah
 Swann
 Wilson

Politics
For most of its history, Cabell County was a swing county, voting for the national winner in every presidential election from 1892 to 2004, aside from 1924 and 1960. However, similar to the rest of West Virginia, it has become a Republican stronghold, with Donald Trump winning the county by a margin of 25 percent over Hillary Clinton in 2016 and by a margin of 18 percent over Joe Biden in 2020.

Notable people
 James F. Adams, Union Army soldier in the American Civil War, and recipient of the Medal of Honor.
 George Baumgardner, MLB player for the St. Louis Browns.
 Wayne Chapman, football coach. 
 Brad Dourif, actor. 
 Catherine Shipe East, government worker and feminist. 
 Diamond Teeth Mary, blues singer. 
 Hal Greer, NBA player.
 Thomas Hannan, revolutionary war soldier, settler of Cabell County.
 Hawkshaw Hawkins, bluegrass singer.
 Albert G. Jenkins, planter, lawyer, politician, and Confederate general.
 Alberta Gallatin Jenkins, stage and screen actress, daughter of Albert G. Jenkins.
 Evan Jenkins: State Senator and US Congressman of West Virginia.
 Ezra Midkiff, MLB player for the Cincinnati Reds and the New York Yankees. 
 Katie Lee, television personality and chef. 
 O.J. Mayo, NBA player. 
 Breece D’J Pancake, short story author. 
 Brett Rowe, stock car driver. 
 Sampson Sanders, slaveholder famous for freeing his 51 slaves upon his death in 1849.  
 Eli C. D. Shortridge, third Governor of North Dakota from 1893 to 1895; born in Cabell County.
 Jason Starkey, NFL player for the Arizona Cardinals.
 Ruth Sullivan, autism advocate.
 Milton Supman, comedian known professionally as Soupy Sales (attended Huntington High School). 
 Phil Swann, singer. 
 Jim Thornton, announcer on Wheel of Fortune.
 Bill Walker, NBA player.
 Kayla Williams, gymnast and gold medalist (attended Huntington High).
 Carter G. Woodson, founder of Black History Month (moved to attend Douglass High School).
 Steve Yeager, MLB player for the Los Angeles Dodgers and the Seattle Mariners, co-MVP of the 1981 World Series.

See also
Beech Fork State Park
Green Bottom Wildlife Management Area
 National Register of Historic Places listings in Cabell County, West Virginia

References

External links

County website
Cabell-Huntington Convention and Visitors Bureau
Cabell County Assessor
Cabell County Schools
Cabell County Public Library

 
West Virginia counties on the Ohio River
Counties of Appalachia